Christiaan Maurits van den Heever, almost universally known C.M. van den Heever (27 February 1902 in the concentration camp near Norvalspont in Cape Province, now Northern Cape Province, South Africa – 8 July 1957), was an Afrikaans-language novelist, poet, essayist, and biographer.

Counted among the Dertigers, van den Heever is noted for his most famous novels: Somer ("Summer") and Laat vrugte ("Late Fruits").  The latter won the Hertzog Prize for prose in 1942.

Van den Heever studied at the University of the Free State in Bloemfontein and the University of Utrecht in the Netherlands.  Upon his return to South Africa, he gained a teaching position at the University of the Free State.  After completing his dissertation on the poet Totius, he finished his academic career at Witwatersrand University.

Bibliography
Juan Zarandona-Santiago Martin (trad.), "Verano. Clásico de la literatura afrikaans" de C.M. van den Heever, Valladolid (Spain), Publicaciones Universidad de Valladolid, 2002, 

1902 births
1957 deaths
People from Umsobomvu Local Municipality
Afrikaans-language poets
Afrikaans-language writers
Afrikaner people
South African people of Dutch descent
South African poets
Hertzog Prize winners for poetry
Hertzog Prize winners for prose
University of the Free State alumni
Utrecht University alumni
20th-century poets